Pestovo is the name of several inhabited localities in Russia.

Arkhangelsk Oblast
As of 2010, two rural localities in Arkhangelsk Oblast bear this name:
Pestovo, Ustyansky District, Arkhangelsk Oblast, a village in Bestuzhevsky Selsoviet of Ustyansky District
Pestovo, Vilegodsky District, Arkhangelsk Oblast, a village in Ilyinsky Selsoviet of Vilegodsky District

Ivanovo Oblast
As of 2010, three rural localities in Ivanovo Oblast bear this name:
Pestovo, Lukhsky District, Ivanovo Oblast, a village in Lukhsky District
Pestovo (Ramenskoye Rural Settlement), Palekhsky District, Ivanovo Oblast, a village in Palekhsky District; municipally, a part of Ramenskoye Rural Settlement of that district
Pestovo (Panovskoye Rural Settlement), Palekhsky District, Ivanovo Oblast, a village in Palekhsky District; municipally, a part of Panovskoye Rural Settlement of that district

Kirov Oblast
As of 2010, one rural locality in Kirov Oblast bears this name:
Pestovo, Kirov Oblast, a village under the administrative jurisdiction of the urban-type settlement of Lalsk, Luzsky District

Kostroma Oblast
As of 2010, three rural localities in Kostroma Oblast bear this name:
Pestovo, Antropovsky District, Kostroma Oblast, a village in Kurnovskoye Settlement of Antropovsky District
Pestovo, Dmitriyevskoye Settlement, Galichsky District, Kostroma Oblast, a village in Dmitriyevskoye Settlement of Galichsky District
Pestovo, Stepanovskoye Settlement, Galichsky District, Kostroma Oblast, a village in Stepanovskoye Settlement of Galichsky District

Kurgan Oblast
As of 2010, one rural locality in Kurgan Oblast bears this name:
Pestovo, Kurgan Oblast, a village in Vvedensky Selsoviet of Mishkinsky District

Moscow Oblast
As of 2010, five rural localities in Moscow Oblast bear this name:
Pestovo, Balashikha, Moscow Oblast, a village under the administrative jurisdiction of the Balashikha City Under Oblast Jurisdiction
Pestovo, Domodedovo, Moscow Oblast, a village under the administrative jurisdiction of the Domodedovo Town Under Oblast Jurisdiction
Pestovo, Mytishchinsky District, Moscow Oblast, a settlement under the administrative jurisdiction of  the work settlement of Pirogovsky, Mytishchinsky District
Pestovo, Odintsovsky District, Moscow Oblast, a village in Nikolskoye Rural Settlement of Odintsovsky District
Pestovo, Pavlovo-Posadsky District, Moscow Oblast, a village in Averkiyevskoye Rural Settlement of Pavlovo-Posadsky District

Nizhny Novgorod Oblast
As of 2010, four rural localities in Nizhny Novgorod Oblast bear this name:
Pestovo, Kumokhinsky Selsoviet, Gorodetsky District, Nizhny Novgorod Oblast, a village in Kumokhinsky Selsoviet of Gorodetsky District
Pestovo, Zinyakovsky Selsoviet, Gorodetsky District, Nizhny Novgorod Oblast, a village in Zinyakovsky Selsoviet of Gorodetsky District
Pestovo, Sharangsky District, Nizhny Novgorod Oblast, a village in Bolsherudkinsky Selsoviet of Sharangsky District
Pestovo, Sokolsky District, Nizhny Novgorod Oblast, a village in Loyminsky Selsoviet of Sokolsky District

Novgorod Oblast
As of 2010, eight inhabited localities in Novgorod Oblast bear this name.

Urban localities
Pestovo, Pestovsky District, Novgorod Oblast, a town in Pestovsky District; administratively incorporated as a town of district significance

Rural localities
Pestovo, Demyansky District, Novgorod Oblast, a village in Pesotskoye Settlement of Demyansky District
Pestovo, Moshenskoy District, Novgorod Oblast, a village in Kirovskoye Settlement of Moshenskoy District
Pestovo, Borovenkovskoye Settlement, Okulovsky District, Novgorod Oblast, a village in Borovenkovskoye Settlement of Okulovsky District
Pestovo, Kulotino, Okulovsky District, Novgorod Oblast, a village under the administrative jurisdiction of the urban-type settlement of Kulotino, Okulovsky District
Pestovo, Nagovskoye Settlement, Starorussky District, Novgorod Oblast, a village in Nagovskoye Settlement of Starorussky District
Pestovo, Velikoselskoye Settlement, Starorussky District, Novgorod Oblast, a village in Velikoselskoye Settlement of Starorussky District
Pestovo, Valdaysky District, Novgorod Oblast, a village in Yazhelbitskoye Settlement of Valdaysky District

Pskov Oblast
As of 2010, six rural localities in Pskov Oblast bear this name:
Pestovo, Novorzhevsky District, Pskov Oblast, a village in Novorzhevsky District
Pestovo, Novosokolnichesky District, Pskov Oblast, a village in Novosokolnichesky District
Pestovo, Palkinsky District, Pskov Oblast, a village in Palkinsky District
Pestovo, Porkhovsky District, Pskov Oblast, a village in Porkhovsky District
Pestovo, Pushkinogorsky District, Pskov Oblast, a village in Pushkinogorsky District
Pestovo, Velikoluksky District, Pskov Oblast, a village in Velikoluksky District

Tula Oblast
As of 2010, one rural locality in Tula Oblast bears this name:
Pestovo, Tula Oblast, a village in Kondukovskaya Rural Administration of Uzlovsky District

Tver Oblast
As of 2010, ten rural localities in Tver Oblast bear this name:
Pestovo (Lugovskoye Rural Settlement), Andreapolsky District, Tver Oblast, a village in Andreapolsky District; municipally, a part of Lugovskoye Rural Settlement of that district
Pestovo (Aksenovskoye Rural Settlement), Andreapolsky District, Tver Oblast, a village in Andreapolsky District; municipally, a part of Aksenovskoye Rural Settlement of that district
Pestovo, Kalininsky District, Tver Oblast, a village in Kalininsky District
Pestovo, Kimrsky District, Tver Oblast, a village in Kimrsky District
Pestovo, Lesnoy District, Tver Oblast, a village in Lesnoy District
Pestovo, Spirovsky District, Tver Oblast, a village in Spirovsky District
Pestovo, Torzhoksky District, Tver Oblast, a village in Torzhoksky District
Pestovo, Vyshnevolotsky District, Tver Oblast, a village in Vyshnevolotsky District
Pestovo, Zapadnodvinsky District, Tver Oblast, a village in Zapadnodvinsky District
Pestovo, Zubtsovsky District, Tver Oblast, a village in Zubtsovsky District

Tyumen Oblast
As of 2010, one rural locality in Tyumen Oblast bears this name:
Pestovo, Tyumen Oblast, a selo in Balagansky Rural Okrug of Vikulovsky District

Vladimir Oblast
As of 2010, one rural locality in Vladimir Oblast bears this name:
Pestovo, Vladimir Oblast, a village in Kovrovsky District

Vologda Oblast
As of 2010, six rural localities in Vologda Oblast bear this name:
Pestovo, Churovsky Selsoviet, Sheksninsky District, Vologda Oblast, a village in Churovsky Selsoviet of Sheksninsky District
Pestovo, Domshinsky Selsoviet, Sheksninsky District, Vologda Oblast, a village in Domshinsky Selsoviet of Sheksninsky District
Pestovo, Nizhneshardengsky Selsoviet, Velikoustyugsky District, Vologda Oblast, a village in Nizhneshardengsky Selsoviet of Velikoustyugsky District
Pestovo, Teplogorsky Selsoviet, Velikoustyugsky District, Vologda Oblast, a village in Teplogorsky Selsoviet of Velikoustyugsky District
Pestovo, Tregubovsky Selsoviet, Velikoustyugsky District, Vologda Oblast, a village in Tregubovsky Selsoviet of Velikoustyugsky District
Pestovo, Vologodsky District, Vologda Oblast, a village in Oktyabrsky Selsoviet of Vologodsky District

Yaroslavl Oblast
As of 2010, three rural localities in Yaroslavl Oblast bear this name:
Pestovo, Bolsheselsky District, Yaroslavl Oblast, a village in Novoselsky Rural Okrug of Bolsheselsky District
Pestovo, Borisoglebsky District, Yaroslavl Oblast, a village in Krasnooktyabrsky Rural Okrug of Borisoglebsky District
Pestovo, Yaroslavsky District, Yaroslavl Oblast, a village in Bekrenevsky Rural Okrug of Yaroslavsky District